Kimberley Jim is a 1963 South African musical comedy film directed by Emil Nofal and starring Jim Reeves, Madeleine Usher and Clive Parnell. Its plot follows an American singer who takes part in the Kimberley diamond rush in South Africa in the late 19th century. More specifically, 
"Jim Reeves and Clive Parnell play likable con-men who earn their living by selling patent medicine and cheating at poker ... two invest their winnings into developing a diamond mine but must outsmart the crooked local businessman", according to one summary.

Reeves, a country singer, enjoyed international popularity during the 1960s. According to Billboard magazine, "Reeves’ star shone equally bright overseas in England, India, Germany, and even South Africa". In the film, the artist sings part of one song in Afrikaans. The soundtrack of 14 songs included the songs "Kimberley Jim," "Strike It Rich," "I Grew Up," "My Life Is A Gypsy," "Born To Be Lucky," "Old Fashioned Rag," "Diamonds In The Sand," "A Stranger's Just A Friend," " Fall In And Follow," "Roving Gambler" and "Dolly With The Dimpled Knees."

Most exteriors were filmed in the area of the small town of Brit while interiors were shot at the Jamie Uys studios in the Northcliff suburb of Johannesburg. Reeves later said that he enjoyed the film-making experience and would consider devoting more of his career to this medium. The film was released in 1965 after Reeves's death in an airplane crash.

Cast
 Jim Reeves - Jim Madison
 Madeleine Usher - Julie Patterson
 Clive Parnell - Gerry Bates
 Arthur Swemmer - Bert Patterson
 Vonk de Ridder - Danny Pretorius
 Tromp Terréblanche - Ben Vorster
 Mike Holt - Punchy
 Dawid van der Walt - Jan le Roux
 Ruth Neethling - Elize
 George Moore - Fred Parker
 Freddie Prozesky - Neels le Roux
 Don Leonard - Rube
 Morris Blake - Max Bloom

Soundtrack

References

External links

1965 films
English-language South African films
Films directed by Emil Nofal
1965 musical comedy films
South African musical comedy films
1960s English-language films